The Beast Must Die is a 1974 British horror film directed by Paul Annett. The screenplay was written by Michael Winder, based on the short story "There Shall Be No Darkness" by James Blish, which was originally published in Thrilling Wonder Stories. The film stars Calvin Lockhart, Peter Cushing, Marlene Clark, Charles Gray, Anton Diffring, Ciaran Madden, Tom Chadbon, and Michael Gambon.

A millionaire big game hunter gathers six people at his remote English mansion, announcing that he suspects one of them is a werewolf. The viewer is invited to unfold the mystery along with the characters. Near the end, there is a 30-second pause called the "werewolf break", where the audience is asked to guess the werewolf's identity, based on clues from the movie. An alternative version of the film was released under the title Black Werewolf.  This cut omits the "werewolf break" near the climax.

Plot summary
Millionaire Tom Newcliffe (Calvin Lockhart) invites a group of people, along with his wife Caroline (Marlene Clark), to spend some time in his rural English mansion, where he reveals that one of them is a werewolf and therefore must be killed. The group is composed of disgraced diplomat Arthur Bennington (Charles Gray); Jan and Davina Gilmore (Michael Gambon and Ciaran Madden), a pianist and his ex-student, now his wife; Paul Foote (Tom Chadbon), an artist recently released from prison; and Professor Lundgren (Peter Cushing), an archaeologist and a lycanthropy enthusiast.

They all stay in the mansion where they are submitted to various tests to detect whether they might be a werewolf. The entire house is under surveillance by CCTV cameras, as well as motion sensors in the grounds around the mansion set up and overseen by Tom's associate Pavel (Anton Diffring), who does not believe in werewolves.

The only way to determine the identity of the werewolf is for a certain combination of elements to occur all at once, including a full moon and the presence of wolfsbane pollen in the air. When this fails to produce any lycanthropic reactions, Tom makes each of the potential werewolves grab silver objects to provoke allergic reactions, but this too proves unsuccessful. Later that same night, Pavel is killed by the werewolf, which makes Tom even more obsessive in his hunt, to his wife's increasing annoyance. Tom gradually focuses his suspicions on Paul Foote, who was reportedly arrested after eating human flesh. Foote denies being the werewolf as the creature continues killing, with the helicopter pilot, diplomat Arthur Bennington, and Caroline's dog all falling victim.

Tom subjects the remaining group to one final test: placing a silver bullet in their mouth. As Caroline submits to the test, her hairy, clawed hand is shown before she immediately transforms into the werewolf. She (fully transformed) attacks Tom, and he kills her by shooting her with a silver bullet, leaving him very distraught and confused because Caroline was alongside him when the werewolf killed her dog. Prof. Lundgren deduces that Caroline must have contracted the werewolf disease while taking care of her dog's wounds due to an open cut on her hand she sustained from a broken wineglass at dinner. Tom becomes enraged, convinced that Foote is the werewolf. When he attempts to confront him, however, he finds that Foote has also been killed. To avenge his wife, he enters the woods surrounding the mansion to hunt the werewolf. He finds the beast and finally shoots and kills it. Once dead, the werewolf reverts to its human form, and it is revealed to be Jan, the pianist.

Tom returns to Prof. Lundgren and Davina, and he realizes that he was bitten by the werewolf during the scuffle, thus condemning him to inherit the creature's curse. Not wanting to be a monster, Tom locks himself in the mansion and shoots himself in the head with a silver bullet, ending the werewolf's bloodline.

Cast

Calvin Lockhart as Tom Newcliffe
Peter Cushing as Professor Christopher Lundgren
Marlene Clark as Caroline Newcliffe
Charles Gray as Arthur Bennington
Anton Diffring as Pavel 
Ciaran Madden as Davina 
Tom Chadbon as Paul Foote
Michael Gambon as Jan Jarmokowski
Sam Mansaray as Butler
Andrew Lodge as Pilot
Carl Bohun as 1st Hunter
Eric Carte as 2nd Hunter
Valentine Dyall as Werewolf Break Narrator (voice, uncredited)
Annie Ross as Caroline Newcliffe (voice, uncredited)

Release

Critical reception
In the audio commentary with director Annett on the home video release, Annett says he hated the addition of the werewolf break: "What can I say about it? I hated it. It stopped the film stone dead and I thought it was completely artificial and unnecessary". It was not in Annett's version of the film; he attributes the idea to producer Milton Subotsky. He does admit that some, including critic Leonard Maltin, liked it.

Allmovie wrote, "The non-anthology output of Amicus Productions tended to be hit-and-miss, but The Beast Must Die is an interesting if lightweight horror-mystery hybrid from the studio."

DVD release
The film was released on DVD as part of the Umbrella Entertainment box set Amicus: The Studio That Dripped Blood. This edition includes the following special features: commentary by director Paul Annett, a "Directing The Beast" featurette, and Amicus Collection trailers.

It is also included in a coffin-shaped Amicus box set released by Anchor Bay UK.

The film was released separately on DVD on 25 July 2006 by Dark Sky Films. The special features included in this release are commentary by director Paul Annett, the "Directing The Beast" featurette, Paul Annett's tribute to Peter Cushing, cast and crew bios, liner notes, trailers, and a still gallery.

The film has subsequently been released on blu-ray by Severin Films in the US and Powerhouse Indicator in the UK.

References

External links

1974 films
1974 directorial debut films
1974 horror films
1970s monster movies
1970s mystery films
Amicus Productions films
British independent films
British supernatural horror films
1970s English-language films
Films based on short fiction
Films scored by Douglas Gamley
Films set in country houses
Mystery horror films
British werewolf films
1970s British films